Cliff Fong (born December 6, 1969) is an American interior designer, fashion designer, and television personality. He is the founder of the Los Angeles interior design firm Matt Blacke Inc. In 2009 he opened show room Galerie Half on Melrose Avenue with partners. Cliff served as host, mentor and judge on Ellen's Design Challenge.
He worked as a fashion buyer for Ron Herman, Fred Segal and Maxfield in Los Angeles. Later working as a stylist, consultant and fashion designer.  In 2004 he co-founded Chatav Ectabit with Sandy Dalal.  As a consultant, he has worked with international retailers such as Harvey Nichols, Isetan, and Joyce, Hong Kong.

Early life and education

Fong was born on December 6, 1969, in Brooklyn, New York. He attended California State University where he majored in art history.

Filmography

Ellen's Design Challenge (2015-2016) — Guest host in Season 1 and judge, host and mentor in Season 2

See also

Interior designer

References

External links

Galerie Half
Robbie Williams Abriu-nos As Portas Da Sua Mansão Em Beverly Hills - Elle Portugal
Riding High: Portia de Rossi and Ellen DeGeneres's Ranch - Elle Decor
Joshua Schulman Takes AD Inside His Townhouse - Architectural Digest
Tour Ryan Murphy’s House in Laguna Beach - Architectural Digest
Inside Ellen DeGeneres and Portia de Rossi’s House in California - Architectural Digest
Q&A: Interior Designer Cliff Fong - LONNY Magazine
The Casual Aesthete: Cliff Fong - DEPARTURES
Be Inspired By Cliff Fong, A NYC-Born Designer Based In LA — Los Angeles homes

Living people
American interior designers
American fashion designers
Television personalities from California
People from Brooklyn
California State University alumni
1969 births